Todd R. Golub is a Professor of Pediatrics at the Harvard Medical School, the Charles A. Dana Investigator in Human Cancer Genetics at the Dana–Farber Cancer Institute, and the Director and a founding member of the Broad Institute of MIT and Harvard.   He is a world leader in applying genomic tools (such as DNA microarrays) to cancer research, having made important discoveries in the molecular basis of childhood leukemia.

He graduated from New Trier High School in 1981 and then received his B.A. in 1985 from Carleton College and M.D. in 1989 from the University of Chicago's Pritzker School of Medicine.

Awards 
 Discover Magazine's Inventor of the Year (Health Category), 2000
 Daland Prize of the American Philosophical Society, 2001
 Cornelius Rhoads Memorial Prize, American Association for Cancer Research, 2002
 Paul Marks Prize for Cancer Research, 2007 
 American Society of Hematology Scholar Award, 1999

Selected publications 

Chapman MA, Lawrence MS, Keats JJ, Cibulskis K, Sougnez C, Schinzel AC, Harview CL, Brunet JP, Ahmann GJ, Adli M, Anderson KC, Ardlie KG, Auclair D, Baker A, Bergsagel PL, Bernstein BE, Drier Y, Fonseca R, Gabriel SB, Hofmeister CC, Jagannath S, Jakubowiak AJ, Krishnan A, Levy J, Liefeld T, Lonial S, Mahan S, Mfuko B, Monti S, Perkins LM, Onofrio R, Pugh TJ, Rajkumar SV, Ramos AH, Siegel DS, Sivachenko A, Stewart AK, Trudel S, Vij R, Voet D, Winckler W, Zimmerman T, Carpten J, Trent J, Hahn WC, Garraway LA, Meyerson M, Lander ES, Getz G, Golub TR. Initial genome sequencing and analysis of multiple myeloma. Nature. 2011 Mar 24;471(7339):467-72.

Lu J, Getz G, Miska EA, Alvarez-Saavedra E, Lamb J, Peck D, Sweet-Cordero A, Ebert BL, Mak RH, Ferrando AA, Downing JR, Jacks T, Horvitz HR, Golub TR. MicroRNA expression profiles classify human cancers. Nature. 2005 Jun 9;435(7043):834-8.

Stegmaier K, Ross KN, Colavito SA, O'Malley S, Stockwell BR, Golub TR. Gene expression-based high-throughput screening (GE-HTS) and application to leukemia differentiation. Nat Genet 2004;36:257-63.

Golub TR, Slonim DK, Tamayo P, Huard C, Gaasenbeek M, Mesirov JP, Coller H, Loh ML, Downing JR, Caligiuri MA, Bloomfield CD, Lander ES.
Molecular classification of cancer: class discovery and class prediction by gene expression monitoring.  Science. 1999 Oct 15;286(5439):531-7.

See also 

 Bioinformatics
 Cancer (2015 PBS film)
 Genomics
 History of cancer
 History of cancer chemotherapy
 The Emperor of All Maladies: A Biography of Cancer

References

External links
 Dr. Golub's Contact Page at Harvard Medical School

1962 births
Living people
Jewish American scientists
Massachusetts Institute of Technology faculty
New Trier High School alumni
Carleton College alumni
Pritzker School of Medicine alumni
Harvard Medical School faculty
Howard Hughes Medical Investigators
21st-century American Jews
Members of the National Academy of Medicine